In Greek mythology, Antiphus or Ántiphos (/ˈæntəfəs/; Ancient Greek: Ἄντιφος) is a name attributed to multiple individuals:

Antiphus, a Phthian prince as the son of King Myrmidon and Peisidice, and brother of Actor. He may be the same with Antippus, the father of Hippea who became the mother of Polyphemus, Caeneus, Ischys and Amycus by Elatus, king of the Lapiths.
Antiphus, the Thespian son of Heracles and Laothoe, daughter of King Thespius of Thespiae. Antiphus and his 49 half-brothers were born of Thespius' daughters who were impregnated by Heracles in one night, for a week or in the course of 50 days while hunting for the Cithaeronian lion. Later on, the hero sent a message to Thespius to keep seven of these sons and send three of them in Thebes while the remaining forty, joined by Iolaus, were dispatched to the island of Sardinia to found a colony.
Antiphus, a defender of Thebes in the war of the Seven against Thebes who was killed by Amphiaraus and Apollo.
Antiphus, son of Thessalus, the son of Heracles, and Chalciope. With his brother Pheidippus, Antiphus lead the forces of Calydnae, Cos, Carpathus, Casus and Nisyrus on the side of the Greeks against Troy. He was also believed to have invaded a region of Greece that he named Thessaly after his father.
Antiphus, a Trojan prince as one of the 50 sons of King Priam and son of Hecuba. During the Trojan War, he was killed by Agamemnon.
Antiphus of Maeonia, son of Talaemenes and brother of Mesthles; both he and his brother were allies of Priam in the Trojan War.
Antiphus, son of Aegyptius and brother of Eurynomus. He was a Greek commander who sailed from Troy with Odysseus. Having previously escaped death at the hand of Eurypylus (son of Telephus), Antiphos was devoured by Polyphemus.
Antiphus, an old friend of the house of Odysseus.

The name Antiphus is not to be confused with Antiphōs (Ἀντίφως), which refers to a soldier in the army of the Seven against Thebes who killed Chromis but was himself killed by Hypseus.

Notes

References 

Apollodorus, The Library with an English Translation by Sir James George Frazer, F.B.A., F.R.S. in 2 Volumes, Cambridge, MA, Harvard University Press; London, William Heinemann Ltd. 1921. ISBN 0-674-99135-4. Online version at the Perseus Digital Library. Greek text available from the same website.

 Athenaeus of Naucratis, The Deipnosophists or Banquet of the Learned. London. Henry G. Bohn, York Street, Covent Garden. 1854. Online version at the Perseus Digital Library.
 Athenaeus of Naucratis, Deipnosophistae. Kaibel. In Aedibus B.G. Teubneri. Lipsiae. 1887. Greek text available at the Perseus Digital Library.
 Diodorus Siculus, The Library of History translated by Charles Henry Oldfather. Twelve volumes. Loeb Classical Library. Cambridge, Massachusetts: Harvard University Press; London: William Heinemann, Ltd. 1989. Vol. 3. Books 4.59–8. Online version at Bill Thayer's Web Site
 Diodorus Siculus, Bibliotheca Historica. Vol 1-2. Immanel Bekker. Ludwig Dindorf. Friedrich Vogel. in aedibus B. G. Teubneri. Leipzig. 1888-1890. Greek text available at the Perseus Digital Library.

Gaius Julius Hyginus, Fabulae from The Myths of Hyginus translated and edited by Mary Grant. University of Kansas Publications in Humanistic Studies. Online version at the Topos Text Project.
Homer, The Iliad with an English Translation by A.T. Murray, Ph.D. in two volumes. Cambridge, MA., Harvard University Press; London, William Heinemann, Ltd. 1924. . Online version at the Perseus Digital Library.
Homer, Homeri Opera in five volumes. Oxford, Oxford University Press. 1920. . Greek text available at the Perseus Digital Library.
 Homer, The Odyssey with an English Translation by A.T. Murray, PH.D. in two volumes. Cambridge, MA., Harvard University Press; London, William Heinemann, Ltd. 1919. . Online version at the Perseus Digital Library. Greek text available from the same website.

 Pausanias, Description of Greece with an English Translation by W.H.S. Jones, Litt.D., and H.A. Ormerod, M.A., in 4 Volumes. Cambridge, MA, Harvard University Press; London, William Heinemann Ltd. 1918. . Online version at the Perseus Digital Library
 Pausanias, Graeciae Descriptio. 3 vols. Leipzig, Teubner. 1903. Greek text available at the Perseus Digital Library.

 Publius Papinius Statius, The Thebaid translated by John Henry Mozley. Loeb Classical Library Volumes. Cambridge, MA, Harvard University Press; London, William Heinemann Ltd. 1928. Online version at the Topos Text Project.
 Publius Papinius Statius, The Thebaid. Vol I-II. John Henry Mozley. London: William Heinemann; New York: G.P. Putnam's Sons. 1928. Latin text available at the Perseus Digital Library.
 Quintus Smyrnaeus, The Fall of Troy translated by Way. A. S. Loeb Classical Library Volume 19. London: William Heinemann, 1913. Online version at theio.com
 Quintus Smyrnaeus, The Fall of Troy. Arthur S. Way. London: William Heinemann; New York: G.P. Putnam's Sons. 1913. Greek text available at the Perseus Digital Library.

 Tzetzes, John, Book of Histories, Book II-IV translated by Gary Berkowitz from the original Greek of T. Kiessling's edition of 1826. Online version at theio.com

Children of Heracles
Achaean Leaders
Trojans
Princes in Greek mythology
Children of Priam
Achaeans (Homer)
Characters in the Odyssey
Thessalian characters in Greek mythology
Thessalian mythology